Norway competed at the 2014 Winter Olympics in Sochi, Russia, from 7 to 23 February 2014.

The 2014 Games marked the first time a Norwegian Olympic team competed in Russia, as Norway and 64 western countries took part at the American-led boycott in the 1980 Summer Olympics held in Moscow due to the Soviet–Afghan War.

Medalists

Alpine skiing 

According to the quota allocation released on 24 January 2014, Norway qualified a total quota of ten athletes in alpine skiing.

Men

Women

Biathlon 

Based on their performance at the 2012 and 2013 Biathlon World Championships, Norway qualified 6 men and 6 women.

Men

Women

Mixed

Cross-country skiing 

Norway was awarded a total quota of twenty athletes by International Ski Federation (FIS), based on qualification points awarded in races within the FIS Calendar during the period of July 2012 – 19 January 2014. National quotas per each Olympic event were allocated according to points awarded in these competitions.

Distance
Men

Women

Sprint
Men

Women

Curling

Based on their performance at the 2012 World Men's Curling Championship and the 2013 World Men's Curling Championship, Norway qualified their men's team as one of the top seven teams in the world.

Team: Thomas Ulsrud, Torger Nergård, Christoffer Svae, Håvard Vad Petersson and Markus Høiberg

Round Robin

Round-robin

Draw 2
Monday, February 10, 7:00 pm

Draw 3
Tuesday, February 11, 2:00 pm

Draw 4
Wednesday, February 12, 9:00 am

Draw 6
Thursday, February 13, 2:00 pm

Draw 7
Friday, February 14, 9:00 am

Draw 8
Friday, February 14, 7:00 pm

Draw 10
Sunday, February 16, 9:00 am

Draw 11
Sunday, February 16, 7:00 pm

Draw 12
Monday, February 17, 2:00 pm

Figure skating 

Norway earned one spot in women's figure skating during the last of the two qualifying events for the 2014 Winter Olympics, the Nebelhorn Trophy in September 2013. This was the first time Norway earned an Olympic spot in figure skating since 1994, and the first participation since 1964.

Freestyle skiing 

Halfpipe

Moguls

Ski cross

Qualification legend: FA – Qualify to medal round; FB – Qualify to consolation round

Slopestyle

Ice hockey 

Norway qualified a men's team by being one of the 9 highest ranked teams in the IIHF World Ranking following the 2012 World Championships.

Men's tournament

Roster

Group stage

Luge

Norway earned three quota places in men's singles.

Nordic combined

Ski jumping 

Norway received the following start quotas

Men

Women

Snowboarding 

Torstein Horgmo qualified for the men's slopestyle, and was considered to be one of the medal contenders, however, while practicing in Sochi, he fell and broke a clavicle, which forced him to miss the Olympics.

Alpine

Freestyle

Qualification Legend: QF – Qualify directly to final; QS – Qualify to semifinal

Snowboard cross

Qualification legend: FA – Qualify to medal round; FB – Qualify to consolation round

Speed skating 

Based on the results from the fall World Cups during the 2013–14 ISU Speed Skating World Cup season, Norway earned the following start quotas:

Men

Women

Team pursuit

References

External links

 Norway at the 2014 Winter Olympics
 Hele OL-troppen klar (in Norwegian) at Norwegian Olympic Committee and Confederation of Sports

Nations at the 2014 Winter Olympics
2014
Winter Olympics